Petra Costa (born on 8 July 1983) is a Brazilian filmmaker and actress. She has been a member of the Academy of Motion Picture Arts and Sciences since 2018.

The first, Undertow Eyes (2009), portrays her grandparents' recollections and stories, in a personal and existential tale about love and death. It screened at the MOMA in 2010 and won best short Film at the Rio de Janeiro International Film Festival 2009, a best short film at the London International Documentary Festival, and best short film at the 13th Cine Las Americas International Film Festival among others.

The second of the trilogy, Elena (2012), her first documentary feature,  is a mixture of documentary, diary, and fever dream, and was the most watched documentary in Brazil in 2013. It tells the story of two sisters – and as one searches for the other their identities begin to blur. The film was called "a cinematic dream" by the New York Times, "haunting and unforgettable" by the Hollywood Reporter, and was defined as a "masterful debut that takes nonfiction where it seldom wants to go – away from the comforting embrace of fact and into a realm of expressionistic possibility" by Indiewire. Elena premiered at IDFA followed by SXSW and Hotdocs won many prizes such as best film at the 2013 Havana Film Festival, best film at DOCSDF, best directing, editing, and best film for the popular jury at the Brasília Film Festival, and was nominated for Best Cinematography at the 2014 Cinema Eye Honors.

Biography 
Petra Costa was born in 1983 in Belo Horizonte, in the state of Minas Gerais. She is the daughter of left-wing political activists who opposed the Brazilian military dictatorship and the granddaughter of Gabriel Donato de Andrade, one of the co-founders of Andrade Gutierrez, one of the country's major construction companies; directly involved in the corruption and bribery scandal that hit the country in 2015, leading to the impeachment of President Dilma Rousseff. Costa acknowledges that background in The Edge of Democracy.

She started her training in theater in Brazil at the age of fourteen and later went to the Dramatic Arts School at the University of São Paulo. She completed her undergraduate studies summa cum laude in Anthropology at Barnard College, Columbia University, New York, and completed her masters in Social Psychology at the London School of Economics focusing her studies on the concept of trauma.

Back in Brazil, at the age of 24, she began devoting her time to the cinema, first as a researcher and assistant editor and director, and then as a director in her own right. Her works are known for their essayistic character, with Petra establishing dialogues between intimate, personal themes and social and political issues.

Her cinematic influences include Gillo Pontecorvo, Agnès Varda, Chris Marker, and Patricio Guzmán

Career 

Petra Costa made her film debut producing and directing the short film Undertow Eyes (2009), a poetic depiction of love and aging as seen from the perspective of her grandparents. The film was screened at MoMA and scooped numerous awards at Brazilian and international festivals: best short film at the Rio Festival and London International Documentary Festival (LIDF), best short documentary at the Cine Las Americas International Film Festival (USA) and special jury's prize at the Gramado Film Festival, among others.

Her first feature film, Elena (2012), in which Petra revisits New York two decades after leaving it in order to seek out the memory of her dead sister, Elena, was presented at the Amsterdam International Documentary Film Festival (IDFA), São Paulo International Film Festival, Brasilia National Film Festival and the Director's Week (Rio de Janeiro). The film won dozens of awards, including best documentary at the Festival of Havana, and was the most widely viewed documentary in Brazil in 2013.

As an offshoot of the documentary's success, a series of debates toured cultural and educational centers discussing the issues of suicide and mental health. The Memórias Inconsoláveis (Inconsolable Memories) competition was part of this drive.

In 2014, Elena was released in the United States with filmmakers Fernando Meirelles and Tim Robbins as executive producers. That year, the documentary came third in the ranking for average viewership per theater throughout the US and was met with critical acclaim. The New York Times described it as "a filmic dream", while the Hollywood Reporter called it "shocking and unforgettable".  Indiewire claimed it was a "masterful debut [that] takes nonfiction where it seldom wants to go – away from the comforting embrace of fact and into a realm of expressionistic possibility". Indiewire listed it among the best documentaries of the year.

In 2014, the publisher Arquipélago launched the book Elena de Petra Costa (Petra Costa's Elena), with essays on the film, the full script and bonus content seen for the first time.

Petra Costa's second feature documentary emerged from an invitation from the Copenhagen International Documentary Festival (CPH: DOX) to co-direct a film with Danish filmmaker Lea Glob. Together, they decided to explore real lives through the fictional structure of Olmo and the Seagull. The film follows Olivia and Serge, actors with the Théâtre du Soleil, who are expecting a baby. Pregnancy turns into a rite of passage, forcing the actress to confront her darkest fears. Olivia's desire for freedom and professional success, the limits imposed by her own body, and her image as a person are just some of the themes the film explores.

Olmo and the Seagull premiered in Locarno, where it won the Jury's Young Director's Prize. It also won the Best Nordic Dox Award at CPH:DOX, best documentary at the Rio Film Festival, best documentary at the Cairo Film Festival and Best Narrative at the RiverRun International Film Festival, among other accolades.

At one of the film's first screenings in Brazil, Petra Costa defended women's right to autonomy over their bodies and the decriminalization of abortion, and her comments stirred up quite a controversy. In order to dialogue with the criticism she received, Petra created the "My Body, My Rules" social media campaign, which was seen by 13 million viewers on Facebook and YouTube.

She made the feature-length documentary The Edge of Democracy (2019) with coverage of the marches for and against the impeachment of former president Dilma Rousseff in 2016. The film is a Netflix production and was released worldwide on June 19, 2019. With ample access to presidents Lula, Dilma and Bolsonaro, the director also revisited her own family history in an attempt to understand the schismatic state her country had fallen into.

The Edge of Democracy premiered on the opening night of the Sundance Film Festival 2019 and was selected for screening at various other international festivals, including CPH:DOX, True False, IndieLisboa, Sheffield and Rooftop Films. The film was a critical success. "An absolutely vital documentary", according to the New York Post, "a vast and petrifying documentary" for Variety, while ScreenDaily described it as a "political thriller […] with the feel of an All the Presidents Men […] and the sweep of the Godfather". For NBC News, the film throws the doors open on "incredible behind the scenes access to politics". "The images are jaw-dropping", said the site Firstshowing.net, while Point of View labelled it "[a documentary] like no other, a work both intimate and grand in scope".

Petra Costa ranked among Variety 10 documentary filmmakers to watch in 2019.

Filmography 
 2005 – Dom Quixote de Bethelehem (Feature film, video documentary)
 2009 – Undertow Eyes (Short film, documentary)

 Rio Film Festival: Best Short Film
 Gramado Film Festival (Brazil) Special Jury Award and Audience Award
 São Paulo International Short Film Festival: New Talents Award
 2012 – Elena (Feature film)
 Brasília National Film Festival: Best Documentary – Audience Award, Best Directing, Editing and Production Design
 Selected for IDFA (Amsterdam International Documentary Film Festival) and Guadalajara International Film Festival
 2015 – Olmo and the Seagull (Feature film, documentary) 
 Rio Film Festival: Best Documentary
2019 – The Edge of Democracy, in Portuguese: Democracia em Vertigem (Feature film, documentary)
 Sundance Official Selection, CPH:Dox, True False.

Awards

References

External links 
 
 
  published 31 January 2020 Amanpour and Company

1983 births
Living people
Brazilian child actresses
Barnard College alumni
Alumni of the London School of Economics
Brazilian film actresses
People from Belo Horizonte